Hopkins Lacy Turney (October 3, 1797August 1, 1857) was a Democratic U.S. Representative and United States Senator from Tennessee.

Biography
Turney was born in the Smith County settlement of Dixon Springs, Tennessee.  As a youth, he was apprenticed to a tailor.  He served in the Seminole War in 1818.  Subsequent to this he studied law, and passed the bar examination and began a practice in Jasper, Tennessee.  Later he moved to Winchester, Tennessee, continuing the practice of law. He owned slaves. He was first elected to the Tennessee House of Representatives in 1828.

He married Teresa Francis, the daughter of Miller Francis and Hannah Henry, in 1826. She was born December 9, 1809 and died September 5, 1879. Hopkins and Teresa were the parents of nine children.

Their son Peter Turney (September 22, 1827October 19, 1903) was Chief Justice of the Tennessee Supreme Court from 1870 to 1893; and served as governor of the U.S. state of Tennessee from 1893 to 1897.

He was then elected to the U.S. House, serving three terms in that body from 1837 to 1843, the 25th through 27th Congresses.  Subsequent to this he was elected by the Tennessee General Assembly to the U.S. Senate, returning to Washington, D.C., after a two-year hiatus and serving one six-year term in that body, where he was chairman of the U.S. Senate Committee on Retrenchment for four years and the U.S. Senate Committee on Patents and the Patent Office for two before returning to his law practice, which he engaged in until shortly before his death.  He is buried in Winchester.

Notes

External links

 

1797 births
1857 deaths
People from Smith County, Tennessee
American people of Swiss-German descent
Democratic Party members of the United States House of Representatives from Tennessee
Democratic Party United States senators from Tennessee
Democratic Party members of the Tennessee House of Representatives
Tennessee lawyers
American slave owners
People from Jasper, Tennessee
People from Winchester, Tennessee
19th-century American politicians
19th-century American lawyers
American people of the Seminole Wars
Military personnel from Tennessee
United States senators who owned slaves